Anderson Preparatory Academy (APA) is a public charter school in Anderson, Indiana, United States, authorized by Ball State University.  The school is a coeducational military-style academy for grades K-12. Anderson Preparatory Academy started on August 4, 2008, with 240 students in grades 6 to 8 and added a grade each year after that, graduating its first senior class at the end of the 2012–2013 school year, when it had 950 students and was one of 38 charter schools sponsored by Ball State.

In 2015 Jill Barker succeeded Robert Guillaume as CEO of the school.

See also
 List of high schools in Indiana

References

External links
 

Charter schools in Indiana
Schools in Madison County, Indiana
Public high schools in Indiana
Public middle schools in Indiana
Public elementary schools in Indiana
Buildings and structures in Anderson, Indiana
Educational institutions established in 2008
2008 establishments in Indiana